Alice Vieira (born 20 March 1943 in Lisbon) is a Portuguese children's book author.

Biography
Vieira graduated from the University of Lisbon with a thesis about Bernard Shaw's theatre. She worked as a journalist before devoting almost all her time to writing books for children and young adults. She has published already more than eight dozen titles, and won several prestigious awards in Portugal in the field of literature for children and teenagers.

Her books have been translated to Bulgarian, Catalan, Chinese, Dutch, French, Galician, German, Hungarian, Italian, Korean, Russian, Serbo-Croatian, Spanish.

Juvenile literature

 1979 – Rosa, Minha Irmã Rosa
 1979 – Paulina ao Piano
 1980 – Lote 12 – 2º Frente
 1982 – Chocolate à Chuva
 1981 – A Espada do Rei Afonso
 1983 – Este Rei que eu Escolhi
 1984 – Graças e Desgraças na Corte de El Rei Tadinho
 1985 – Águas de Verão
 1986 – Flor de Mel
 1987 – Viagem à Roda do meu Nome
 1988 – Às Dez a Porta Fecha
 1990 – Úrsula, a Maior
 1990 – Os Olhos de Ana Marta
 1991 – Promontório da Lua
 1995 – Caderno de Agosto
 1997 – Se Perguntarem por mim, Digam que Voei
 2001 – Trisavó de Pistola à Cinta
 2008 – Vinte Cinco a Sete Vozes 
 2008 – Um Fio de Fumo nos Confins do Mar
 2008 – O Casamento da Minha Mãe
 2008 – A Vida Nas palavras de Inês Tavares
 2010 – Meia Hora Para Mudar a Minha Vida
 2009 – A Lua Não Está à Venda

Books for children 
 1986 – De que são Feitos os Sonhos
 1988 – As Mãos de Lam Seng
 1988 – O que Sabem os Pássaros
 1988 – As Árvores que Ninguém Separa
 1988 – Um Estranho Baralho de Asas
 1988 – O Tempo da Promessa
 1990 – Macau: da Lenda à História
 1991 – Corre, Corre, Cabacinha
 1991 – Um Ladrão debaixo da Cama
 1991 – Fita, Pente e Espelhon 
 1991 – A Adivinha do Rei
 1992 – Rato do Campo, Rato da Cidade
 1992 – Periquinho e Periquinha
 1992 – Maria das Silvas
 1993 – As Três Fiandeiras
 1993 – A Bela Moura
 1994 – O Pássaro Verde
 2006 – Livro com Cheiro a Chocolate
 2007 – Livro com Cheiro a Morango
 2007 – Livro com Cheiro a Baunilha
 2008 – Livro com Cheiro a Caramelo
 2009 – Livro com Cheiro a Canela
 2010 – Livro com Cheiro a Banana
 2010 – Contos de Grimm Para Meninos Valentes
 2010 – Contos de Andersen para Meninos Sem Medo
 2011 – Contos de Perrault para Crianças Aventureiras
 2010 – A Arca do Tesouro (jdgfsv dfAF D
com música de Eurico Carrapatoso)
 2011 – Charada da Bicharada
 2011 – Rimas Perfeitas, Imperfeitas e Mais que Perfeitas

Books for adults 
 2010 – Os Profetas (romance)
 2007 – Dois Corpos Tombando na Água (poesia—Prémio Mª Amália Vaz de Carvalho
 2009 – O Que Dói às Aves" (poesia)
 1994 – Esta Lisboa
 1997 – Praias de Portugal
 2003 – Tejo (com fotografias de Neni Glock)
 2004 – Bica Escaldada (crónicas)
 2005 – Pezinhos de Coentrada (crónicas
 2006 – O Que se Leva Desta Vida (crónicas)
 2014 – "Os Armários da Noite" (poesia)

Awards
 1979 – Prémio de Literatura Infantil Ano Internacional da Criança, for Rosa, Minha Irmã Rosa.
 1983 – Prémio Calouste Gulbenkian de Literatura Infantil, for Este Rei que Eu Escolhi.
 1994 – Prémio Gulbenkian, for her overall work.
 2000 – Prix Octogone, for the French translation of "Os Olhos de Ana Marta".
 2010 – Silver Star of the Peter Pan Award, for the Swedish translation of "Flor de Mel".

References

Portuguese women children's writers
1943 births
Living people
Portuguese journalists
20th-century Portuguese women writers
Portuguese women journalists
People from Lisbon
University of Lisbon alumni